Kavakdibi can refer to:

 Kavakdibi, Bitlis
 Kavakdibi, Kozluk